Daiyan Henley (born November 18, 1999) is an American football linebacker. He played college football at Nevada before playing the 2022 season with Washington State.

Early life
Henley was born on November 18, 1999, in Los Angeles, California. He later attended Crenshaw High School.

College career
Henley began his college career at Nevada, where he played wide receiver for his first two seasons. Henley caught 17 passes for 232 yards and three touchdowns before being moved to defense before the start of his junior season. He suffered a season-ending injury and used a medical redshirt on the year. Henley made 49 tackles as a redshirt junior. In 2021, he made 103 tackles with three tackles for loss and four interceptions and was named second team All-Mountain West Conference. Following the end of the season, Henley entered the NCAA transfer portal.

Henley ultimately transferred to the Washington State Cougars for his final season of NCAA eligibility over offers from USC, Kansas State, and Washington.

References

External links
Washington State Cougars bio
Nevada Wolf Pack bio

Living people
Players of American football from Los Angeles
American football linebackers
American football wide receivers
Washington State Cougars football players
Nevada Wolf Pack football players
1999 births
Crenshaw High School alumni